Cooper is an English surname originating in England;  see Cooper (profession). Occasionally it is an Anglicized form of the German surname Kiefer. Cooper is the 8th most common surname in Liberia and 27th most common in England.

A 
Adam Cooper (dancer) (born 1971), actor, choreographer, dancer and theater director
Adrian Cooper (born 1968), American football tight end
Adrienne Cooper (1946–2011), American Yiddish singer, musician and activist
Afua Cooper (born 1957), Jamaican-Canadian poet and academic
Alan Cooper (bishop) (1909–1999), British Anglican bishop
Alan Cooper (born 1952), American creator of Visual Basic
Alan Cooper (biblical scholar), American
Albert Cooper (disambiguation), multiple people
Alex Cooper (architect) (born 1936), American architect
Alex Cooper (sailor) (born 1942), Bermudian Olympic sailor
Alex Cooper (footballer) (born 1991), Scottish footballer
Alexander Cooper (1609–1660), English painter
Alfred Cooper (disambiguation), multiple people
Alice Cooper (born 1948), born Vincent Damon Furnier, American Singer and musician
Alison Cooper (born 1966), British businesswoman
Allen Foster Cooper (1838–1918), American politician
Amari Cooper (born 1994), American football wide receiver
Anderson Cooper (born 1967), American journalist
Andre Cooper (born 1975), American footballer wide receiver
Andrew Cooper (disambiguation), multiple people
Angus Cooper (born 1964), New Zealand hammer thrower
Ann Cooper Whitall (1716–1797), American Quaker
Ann Nixon Cooper (1902–2009), African-American representative
Anna J. Cooper (1859–1964), African-American educator
Anthony Ashley-Cooper (disambiguation), 10 of the 12 Earls of Shaftesbury
Anton Cooper (born 1994), New Zealand cross-country mountain biker
Arif Cooper (died 2023), Jamaican musician
Armando Cooper (born 1987), Panamanian footballer
Artemis Cooper (born 1953), British writer
Ashley Cooper (disambiguation), multiple people
Astley Cooper (1768–1841), English surgeon
Audrey Cooper (born 1977), American journalist

B 
B. Cooper (born 1984), American Christian hip-hop musician
Barbara Cooper (politician) (1929–2022), American politician
Barbara Cooper (RAF officer) (born 1959), British Royal Air Force officer
Barry Cooper (disambiguation), multiple people
Ben Cooper (disambiguation), multiple people
Bernard Cooper (born 1951), American novelist
Bert Cooper (American football) (born 1952), American football player
Bert Cooper (1966–2019), American boxer
Bertie Cooper (1892–1916), Australian rules footballer
Besse Cooper (1896–2012), American supercentenarian and world's oldest person during 2011–2012
Bette Cooper (1924–2017), Miss America 1937
Bill and Billy Cooper (disambiguation), multiple people
Bill Cooper (American football) (born 1939), professional football player for the San Francisco 49ers
Bill Cooper (hurler) (born 1987), Irish hurler
Billy Cooper (footballer) (born 1917), English footballer
Billy Cooper (Canadian football) (born 1945), Canadian football player
Billy Cooper (trumpeter), cricket supporter and trumpet player for the Barmy Army
Blake Cooper (born 2001), American actor
Bob Cooper (disambiguation), multiple people
Bob Cooper (musician) (1925–1993), American jazz musician
Bob Cooper (racing driver) (born 1935), American NASCAR Cup Series driver
Bob Cooper (politician) (1936–2004), politician and activist in Northern Ireland
Bob Cooper (speedway rider) (born 1950), English speedway rider
Bob Cooper (journalist) (born 1954), freelance writer and Runner's World columnist, ultramarathoner
Bob Cooper (rugby league), Australian former professional rugby league footballer
Bonnie Cooper (1935–2018), All-American Girls Professional Baseball League player.
BP Cooper, American screenwriter, film and commercial producer
Brad Cooper (born 1954), Australian Olympic swimmer
Bradley Cooper (athlete) (born 1957), Bahamian discus thrower and shot putter
Bradley Cooper (born 1975), American actor
Bransby Cooper (1844–1914), Australian cricketer
Brenda Cooper, American author
Brent Cooper (judoka) (born 1960), New Zealand Olympic judoka and judo administrator
Bret Cooper (born 1970), American football player
Brett Cooper (footballer) (born 1959), Australian rules footballer
Brett Cooper (fighter) (born 1987), American mixed martial artist
Brian Cooper (disambiguation), multiple people
Britney Cooper (born 1989), West Indian cricketer from Trinidad
Brittnee Cooper (born 1988), American volleyball player
Bryan Cooper (politician) (1884–1930), Irish politician
Bryan Cooper (jockey) (born 1992), Irish National Hunt jockey
Buster Cooper (1929–2016), American jazz trombonist

C 
Caitlin Cooper (born 1988), Australian soccer player
Camille Cooper (born 1979), American basketball player
Carl Cooper (born 1960), British Anglican bishop
Carolyn Cooper (born 1950), Jamaican author
Cary Cooper (born 1940), American-born British psychologist
Cathy Cooper (born 1960), American artist
Cec Cooper (born 1926), Australian rugby league footballer
Cecil Cooper (bishop) (1882–1964), British Bishop
Cecil Cooper (born 1949), American baseball player
Charles Cooper (disambiguation), multiple people
Charlotte Cooper (disambiguation), multiple people
Chris Cooper (disambiguation), multiple people
Christin Cooper (born 1959), American skier
Clarence Cooper (disambiguation), multiple people
Colin Cooper (disambiguation), multiple people
Colm Cooper (born 1983), Irish Gaelic footballer
Courtney Ryley Cooper (1886–1940), American circus clown
Craig Cooper (disambiguation), multiple people
Curtis Cooper (disambiguation), multiple people
Cynthia Cooper (disambiguation), multiple people
Cyrus Cooper, rheumatologist

D 
Daniel C. Cooper (1773–1818), early American surveyor and politician
D. B. Cooper, epithet for an unknown airline hijacker from 1971
D. C. Cooper (born 1965), American heavy metal singer
D. J. Cooper (born 1990), American basketball player in the Israeli Basketball Premier League
David Cooper (disambiguation), multiple people
Darren Cooper (died 2016), British Labour Party politician
Dennis Cooper (born 1953), American poet and writer
Dewey Cooper (born 1974), American kickboxer and boxer
Lady Diana Cooper (1892–1986), British actress
Dolores G. Cooper (1922–1999), American politician
Dominic Cooper  (born 1978), British actor
Don Cooper (born 1957), American baseball player
Don Cooper, American curler
Douglas Cooper (disambiguation), multiple people
Duff Cooper (1890–1954), British politician and writer

E 
Earl Cooper (1886–1965), American race car driver
Eddie Cooper (actor) (born 1987), British actor
Eddie Cooper (cricketer) (1915–1968), English cricketer
Edmund Cooper (1926–1982), English writer
Edward Cooper (disambiguation), multiple people
Edwin Cooper (1785–1833), English artist
Ethan Cooper, American football player
Elizabeth Cooper (died 1960), Filipino-American actress
Emma Lampert Cooper (1855–1920), American painter
Eric Cooper (1966–2019), American professional baseball umpire
Eric Thirkell Cooper, British soldier and war poet during World War 1

F 
Frank Cooper (disambiguation), multiple people
Frederic Taber Cooper (1864–1937), American writer, editor and academic
Frederick Cooper (disambiguation), multiple people

G 
G. Cooper (Surrey cricketer), English amateur cricketer
Gareth Cooper, Wales rugby union player
Garrett Cooper, American baseball player
Gary Cooper (disambiguation), multiple people
George Cooper (disambiguation), multiple people
Gladys Cooper (1888–1971), English actress
Gordon Cooper (1927–2004), American astronaut
Graham Cooper (cricketer) (1936–2012), English cricketer
Grant Cooper (born 1982), Spanish millionaire
Grey Cooper (1720–1801), English politician

H 
Harry Cooper (disambiguation), multiple people
Helen Cooper (disambiguation), multiple people
Helene Cooper (born 1966), Liberian-American author and journalist
Henry Cooper (disambiguation), multiple people
Hugh Lincoln Cooper (1865–1937), American engineer
Humility Cooper, English passenger on the Mayflower

I 
Ian Cooper (disambiguation), multiple people
Ivan Cooper (1944–2019), Northern Ireland politician

J 
Jack Cooper (disambiguation), multiple people
Jackie Cooper (1922–2011), American actor
Jacqui Cooper (born 1973), Australian skier
Jade Holland Cooper (born 1986/1987), British fashion designer
James Cooper (disambiguation), multiple people
Jeanne Cooper (1928–2013), American actress
Jeff Cooper (disambiguation), multiple people
Jenny Cooper (born 1974), Canadian actress
Jenny Cooper (lawyer), corporate lawyer and Queen's Counsel from New Zealand
Jere Cooper (1893–1957), American politician
Jerry W. Cooper (1948–2020), American politician
Jessica Cooper (born 1967), British artist
Jessie Cooper (1914–1993), Australian politician
Jilly Cooper (born 1937), English novelist
Jim Cooper (disambiguation), multiple people
Jimmy Cooper (disambiguation), multiple people
Joan Cooper (social worker) (1914–1999), English civil servant and social worker
Job Adams Cooper (1843–1899), American politician
Joe Cooper (disambiguation), multiple people
John Cooper (disambiguation), multiple people
Johnny Cooper (disambiguation), multiple people
Jonathon Cooper (born 1998), American football player
Joseph Cooper (disambiguation), multiple people
Joshua Cooper (disambiguation), multiple people
Julie Cooper (disambiguation), multiple people
Justin Cooper (disambiguation), multiple people
Justine Cooper (disambiguation), multiple people

K 
Kenneth H. Cooper (born 1931), American Air Force colonel, doctor and aerobics pioneer
Kenny Cooper (born 1984), American soccer player
Kenny Cooper Sr. (born 1946), former English soccer goalkeeper and coach
Kevin Cooper (disambiguation), multiple people
Kevon Cooper (born 1989), Trinidadian cricketer
Kitty Cooper, American bridge player
Korey Cooper (born 1972), American musician, member of Skillet
Kyle Cooper (born 1962), American designer of motion picture title sequences
Kyle Cooper (rugby union) (born 1989), South African rugby union player

L 
Lamart Cooper (born 1973), American football player
Leigh Cooper (born 1961), English footballer
Leon Cooper (born 1930), American physicist
Les Cooper (1921–2013), American musician
Lettice Cooper (1897–1994), English writer
Levi Cooper – The Maggid of Melbourne, Australian Orthodox Jewish teacher
Lindsay Cooper (1951–2013), English musician (bassoon and oboe), composer and activist
Lindsay L. Cooper (1940–2001), Scottish musician (double-bass and cello)
Lionel Cooper, Australian rugby league player
Lionel Cooper (1915–1979), South African mathematician
Louise Cooper (1952–2009), British writer

M 
MacDella Cooper (born 1977), Liberian philanthropist
Malcolm Cooper, British sport shooter
Malcolm Cooper (footballer), Aboriginal Australian footballer
Marc Cooper, American journalist and blogger
Marianne Leone Cooper (born 1952), American actress
Mark Cooper (disambiguation), multiple people
Marquis Cooper (1982–2009), American football player
Martha Cooper (born c. 1940), American photojournalist
Martin Cooper (disambiguation), multiple people
Matt Cooper (disambiguation), multiple people
Matthew Cooper (disambiguation), multiple people
Merian C. Cooper (1893–1973), American movie actor, director, screenwriter and producer
Michael Cooper (disambiguation), multiple people
Mike Cooper (disambiguation), multiple people
Milton William Cooper (1943–2001), American writer
Miranda Cooper (born 1975), British songwriter
Mort Cooper (1913–1958), American baseball player
Muriel Cooper (1925–1994), American artist and designer
Myers Y. Cooper (1873–1958), American politician

N 
Nancy Cooper, American journalist, editor of Newsweek
Nathan Cooper (disambiguation), multiple people
Neale Cooper (born 1963), Scottish football manager
Nicholas Ashley-Cooper, 12th Earl of Shaftesbury (born 1979), Earl of Shaftesbury

P 
Pat Cooper (born 1929), American comedian
Paul Cooper (disambiguation), multiple people
Paulette Cooper (born 1944), American journalist
Peter Cooper (disambiguation), multiple people
Philip Cooper (1885–1950), English cricketer
Philip H. Cooper (1844–1912), American admiral
Priscilla Cooper Tyler (1816–1889), de facto First Lady of USA 1842–44

Q 
Quade Cooper (born 1988), Australian rugby union player

R 
Ray Cooper (born 1942), English musician
Revel Cooper (died 1983), Australian artist
Richard Cooper (disambiguation), multiple people
Riley Cooper (born 1987), US American Football player
Risteárd Cooper, Irish comedian
Robert Cooper (disambiguation), multiple people
Roger Cooper (born 1944), Minnesota politician
Roger Cooper (British businessman) (born 1935), jailed as spy in Iran
Roger Cooper (paleontologist) (1939–2020), New Zealand paleontologist
Rosa Cooper (1829–1877), English actress in Australia.
Rosie Cooper (born 1950), British politician
Roxanne Cooper, British singer
Roy Cooper (disambiguation), multiple people
Rusi Cooper (born 1922), Indian cricketer
Russell Cooper (disambiguation), multiple people

S 
Samuel Cooper (disambiguation), multiple people
Sarah Cooper (disambiguation), multiple people
Selina Cooper (1864–1946), English suffragist and politician
Shane Cooper (disambiguation), multiple people
Shani Cooper, Israeli diplomat
Shaun Cooper (born 1983), English footballer
Sherry Cooper, Canadian-American, Chief Economist of BMO Capital Markets
(Thomas) Sidney Cooper (1803–1902), English painter
Simon Cooper (disambiguation), multiple people
Stoney Cooper (1918–1977), American country musician
Susan Cooper (disambiguation), multiple people

T 
Tarzan Cooper (1907–1980), American basketball player
Terence Cooper (1933–1997), Northern Irish actor
Terry Cooper (disambiguation), multiple people
 Terry Cooper (footballer, born 1944) (1944–2021), with Leeds United
 Terry Cooper (footballer, born 1950), Welsh footballer with Lincoln City
Theodore Cooper (1839–1919), American engineer
Thomas Cooper (disambiguation), multiple people, including
Thomas Cooper (American politician, born 1759) (1759–1840), American educationalist and political philosopher in South Carolina
Thomas Cooper (American politician, born 1764) (1764–1829), U.S. congressman from Delaware
Thomas Cooper (bishop) (c. 1517–1594), English bishop of Lincoln and Winchester
Thomas Cooper (brewer) (1826–1897), founder of Coopers Brewery
Thomas Cooper (Parliamentarian) (died 1659), colonel in the Parliamentary Army and politician
Thomas Cooper (pilot) (1833–1906), American maritime pilot
Thomas Cooper (poet) (1805–1892), English poet and Chartist
Thomas Cooper de Leon (1839–1914), American journalist, author and playwright
Thomas Apthorpe Cooper (1776–1849), English actor
Thomas E. Cooper (born 1943), Assistant Secretary, U.S. Air Force
Thomas Edwin Cooper (1874–1942), English architect
Thomas Frederick Cooper, Tommy Cooper (1921–1984), British comedian and magician
Thomas Frederick Cooper (watchmaker) (1789–1863), English watchmaker
Thomas Haller Cooper (1919–1987), member of the British Free Corps and convicted traitor
Thomas Joshua Cooper (born 1946), American landscape photographer
Thomas Buchecker Cooper (1823–1862), U.S. congressman from Pennsylvania
Thomas Sidney Cooper (1803–1902), English painter
Thomas Thornville Cooper (1839–1878), English traveller in China
Thomas Valentine Cooper (1835–1909), American politician from Pennsylvania
Thomas Cooper, 1st Baron Cooper of Culross (1892–1955), Scottish politician, judge and historian
Tim Cooper (disambiguation), multiple people, including
Tim Cooper (brewer), managing director of Coopers Brewery
Tim Cooper (footballer), New Zealand international
Tina Cooper (1918–1986), English paediatrician
Tom Cooper (baseball) (1927–1985), American Negro league baseball player
Tom Cooper (cricketer) (born 1986), Netherlands and South Australia cricketer
Tom Cooper (cyclist) (1874–1906), American racing cyclist and early automobile driver
Tom Cooper (footballer) (1904–1940), England international footballer
Tom Cooper (rugby union) (born 1987), English rugby union player
Tommy Cooper (1921–1984), British magician and comedian

W 
Walker Cooper (1915–1991), American baseball player
Warren Cooper (born 1933), New Zealand politician
Whina Cooper (1895–1994), New Zealand Māori leader
Wilbur Cooper (1892–1973), American baseball player
W. E. Shewell-Cooper (1900–1982), British organic gardener
Wilhelmina Cooper (1939–1980), American model
William Cooper (disambiguation), multiple people
Wilson Marion Cooper (died 1916), American Sacred Harp teacher
Wyatt Emory Cooper (1927–1978), American screenwriter
Wyllis Cooper (1899–1955), American radio writer

Y 
Yvette Cooper (born 1969), British Labour Party politician and 2015 Labour leadership contender

Fictional characters 
Alison Cooper, character from Ghosts 2019 TV series
Barbara Cooper, character from One Day at a Time (1975 TV series)
Betty Cooper, character from Archie Comics
Buzz Cooper, character from the soap opera Guiding Light
Dale Cooper, character from the TV show Twin Peaks
Gwen Cooper, character from the Doctor Who spinoff series Torchwood
Gwendolyn "Winnie" Cooper, character from The Wonder Years TV Series
Kaitlin Cooper, character from the TV series The O.C.
Lauren Cooper, character in The Catherine Tate Show
Marina Cooper, character from the soap opera Guiding Light
Marissa Cooper, character from the TV series The O.C.
Mark Cooper, character from the TV series Hangin' with Mr. Cooper
 Mike Cooper, character from the 2019 TV series Ghosts
Sheldon Cooper, character from the American TV sitcom The Big Bang Theory
Sly Cooper, character from the Sly Cooper video games
Tamia "Coop" Cooper, a character in the television series All American
Valerie "Val" Cooper, character from the Marvel Universe
K.C. Cooper and other members of her family, from K.C. Undercover

See also 
Cooper (given name)
Cooper (disambiguation)
 Justice Cooper (disambiguation)
Couper, a surname
Kupper, a related surname of Germanic origin
Hooper (surname)
 Coopes, a surname
 Coops, a surname
 Coope, a surname
 Coop (surname)
 Cooper (surname)

Notes 

English-language surnames
Occupational surnames
Surnames of English origin
Surnames of Liberian origin
English-language occupational surnames